Deathhammer is the eighth studio album by Dutch death-doom band Asphyx. The album was released on February 27, 2012 in Europe and February 28, 2012 in USA through Century Media. It is also the last studio album to feature founding member Bob Bagchus, who left from the band in order to spend more time with his family and replaced by Stefan Hüskens.

Track listing

Personnel

Asphyx
 Martin van Drunen - Vocals
 Paul Baayens - Guitars
 Alwin Zuur - Bass
 Bob Bagchus - Drums

Production
 Paul Baayens – recording (guitars and bass)
 Harry Wijering – recording (drums and vocals)
 Dan Swanö – mixing, mastering
 Axel Hermann – cover artwork, illustrations, handwriting
 Carsten Drescher – layout
 César Valladares – inlay illustrations

References

2012 albums
Asphyx albums
Century Media Records albums